Yevgeni Prokofyevich Nikishin (21 May 1904 in Moscow – 25 March 1965 in Moscow) was a Soviet Russian football player and coach.

External links
 

1904 births
Footballers from Moscow
1965 deaths
Russian footballers
Soviet footballers
PFC CSKA Moscow players
Soviet football managers
PFC CSKA Moscow managers
Association football midfielders